The Woronora Plateau is a plateau located in New South Wales, Australia. The area is adjacent to the Sydney Plains and is slightly higher in altitude. It is capped with Hawkesbury Sandstone. It is often hotter in summer and colder in winter than metropolitan Sydney. The Woronora River flows through the deeply dissected plateau to the Georges River from near the sources of the Port Hacking, within the Sutherland Shire.

Located between the Woronora River and Forbes Creek it holds the suburb of Woronora Heights.

See also
Geography of Sydney
Hornsby Plateau

References

Geography of Sydney
Plateaus of Australia